Gottfried Wilhelm Leibniz (1646–1716) was a German philosopher and mathematician.

Leibniz may also refer to:

Friedrich Leibniz (1597–1652), father of Gottfried Leibniz
Leibniz or Leibniz-Keks, a brand of biscuit

See also 
Leibnitz (disambiguation)
List of things named after Gottfried Leibniz